Hugh de Lowther of Lowther and Newton Reigny, was an English noble and administrator. He was Sheriff of Edinburgh in 1295.

He was the eldest son of Geoffrey de Lowther. Hugh was Kings Attorney in 1291-1292, Sheriff of Edinburgh in 1295 and Justice Itinerant in 1307.

Marriage and issue
Hugh married Ivetta, daughter of Henry D'Alneto, they are known to have had the following known issue:
Hugh de Lowther

References
Washington, George Sydney Horace Lee. Early Westmorland M.P.s, 1258-1327. Issue 15 of Tract series. T. Wilson, 1959.

Year of birth unknown
1317 deaths
Medieval English knights
13th-century English people
14th-century English people